The Maastricht–Venlo railway is a railway line in the Netherlands running from Maastricht to Venlo, passing through Sittard and Roermond. The line was opened in 1865. It is part of the Staatslijn "E".

Stations
The main interchange stations on the Maastricht–Venlo railway are:

Maastricht: to Liège and Heerlen
Sittard: to Heerlen
Roermond: to Eindhoven
Venlo: to Eindhoven, Düsseldorf and Nijmegen

Railway lines in the Netherlands
Railway lines in Limburg (Netherlands)
South Limburg (Netherlands)
Transport in Maastricht
Transport in Sittard-Geleen
Transport in Roermond
Transport in Venlo